The Solnhofen Plattenkalk, a collective term of multiple Late Jurassic lithographic limestones in southeastern Germany, is famous for its well preserved fossil flora and fauna dating to the late Jurassic.

Chondrichthyes

Chondrostei

Halecostomi

Semionotidae

Macrosemiidae

Pycnodontiformes

Pachycormidae

Others

Halecomorphi

Caturidae

Ionoscopidae

Furidae

Other halecomorphs

Halecomorphi incertae sedis

Teleostei

Pleuropholidae

Aspidorhynchidae

Pholidophoridae

Allothrissopidae

Orthogonikleithridae

Anaethalionidae

Others

Reptiles

Lizards

Rhynchocephalians

Ichthyosaurs

Turtles

Crocodylomorphs

Dinosaurs

Pterosaurs

Invertebrate paleofauna

Crinoids

Cephalopods
{| class="wikitable" align="center"  width="100%"
|-
! colspan="5" align="center" |Cephalopods of the Solnhofen Formation
|-
! Taxa
! Presence
! Notes
! Images
|
|-
|
Belemnotheutis mayri<ref name="lomax">{{cite journal|last1=Lomax|first1=Dean R.|year=2010|title=Am Ichthyosaurus (Reptilia, Ichthyosauria) with gastric contents from Charmouth, England: First report of the genus from the Pliensbachian|journal=Paludicola|volume=8|issue=1|pages=22–36|publisher=Rochester Institute of Vertebrate Paleontology|url=http://www.bhbfonline.org/Research/Lomax_-_Published_paper%5B1%5D.pdf|access-date=February 8, 2011|url-status=dead|archive-url=https://web.archive.org/web/20120726092143/http://www.bhbfonline.org/Research/Lomax_-_Published_paper%5B1%5D.pdf|archive-date=July 26, 2012}}</ref>
|
|
| rowspan="101" |

|-
|Plesioteuthis|
|
|-
|Physodoceras|
|An ammonite
|-
|Fontannesiella|
|An ammonite 
|}

Xiphosura

 Thylacocephalans 

Insects

References

General
 Lambers, P. H. (1999). The actinopterygian fish fauna of the Late Kimmeridgian and Early Tithonian 'Plattenkalke' near Solnhofen (Bavaria, Germany): state of the art. Geologie en Mijnbouw'' 78:215-229.